Rafał Wieruszewski (born 24 February 1981 in Środa Wielkopolska) is a Polish sprinter who specializes in the 400 metres.

Achievements

Personal bests
 200 metres – 21.06 s (2002)
 400 metres – 45.56 s (2006)

References

External links
 

1981 births
Polish male sprinters
Living people
Athletes (track and field) at the 2008 Summer Olympics
Olympic athletes of Poland
World Athletics Championships medalists
People from Środa Wielkopolska
European Athletics Championships medalists
Sportspeople from Greater Poland Voivodeship
Universiade medalists in athletics (track and field)
Goodwill Games medalists in athletics
Universiade gold medalists for Poland
Universiade silver medalists for Poland
Universiade bronze medalists for Poland
World Athletics Indoor Championships medalists
Medalists at the 2003 Summer Universiade
Medalists at the 2005 Summer Universiade
Medalists at the 2009 Summer Universiade
Competitors at the 2001 Goodwill Games
21st-century Polish people